The Fujifilm FinePix A series of digital cameras consists of the company's entry-level point and shoot models. The A series was created in late 2001 and was expanded a few years later when Fujifilm transitioned to a fully alphanumeric system of naming their digital cameras. 

The first A series models were the 1.3-megapixel A101 and 2-megapixel A201, released in late 2001. The A-series cameras remained extremely basic until the successful FinePix 2600 and FinePix 2650 cameras evolved into the A205 and A210 in 2003. Over 20 models of A-series cameras have been produced and they have become progressively more sophisticated and smaller while retaining a low price. In 2008, the A series was partially succeeded by the FinePix J series.

Some A-series cameras have had standard CCD sensors while others have Fujifilm's own SuperCCD sensor. Cameras based on the latter have had very high image quality for their price.

All but the first two A-series cameras have used the xD-Picture Card flash memory format.

Models

 A100
 A101
 A120
 A150
 A170
 A175
 A180
 A200
 A201
 A202
 A203 Zoom
 A205 Zoom
 A210 Zoom
 A220
 A225
 A230
 A235
 A303 Zoom
 A310
 A330
 A340
 A345
 A350
 A345
 A400
 A500
 A500 Blue
 A510 Black
 A510 Red
 A600
 A607
 A610
 A700
 A800
 A805
 A820
 A850
 A900
AX350
AV250
AV230
AV200
AX510
AV220
AX550

A310 
3.1 MP, color digital camera.

As of the 2011 FinePix A310 cost as low as $15 used, with auctions starting also at 99¢ with original selling price $299 in 2003.

See also
 Fujifilm FinePix
 Fujifilm cameras
 Fujifilm

References

A series